U-149 may refer to one of the following German submarines:

 , a Type U 142 submarine launched during World War I but unfinished at the end of the war; broken up incomplete 1919–20
 During the First World War, Germany also had this submarine with a similar name:
 , a Type UB III submarine launched in 1918; broken up in 1922
 , a Type IID submarine that served in the Second World War; taken to Loch Ryan on 30 June 1945; sunk on 21 December 1945 as a part of Operation Deadlight

Submarines of Germany